The Kazakh Naval Forces () is the naval warfare branch of the Armed Forces of the Republic of Kazakhstan. The navy mainly operates on the Caspian Sea and is currently based in the coastal city of Aktau.

The branch currently has a strength of 3,000 personnel and is mainly equipped with patrol crafts, minesweepers and a research vessel.

History 
Previously, the Soviet Navy's Caspian Flotilla served in the shores of the Kazakh SSR. Following the Dissolution of the Soviet Union, the fleet shrank, leaving the Kazakh contingent to serve as a basis for the newly formed navy. Kazakhstan's Naval Forces were established in April 1993 as a naval base of the Kazakh Army. The base, which was stationed in Aktau, initially became active in service on August 17, 1996, in spite of Kazakhstan being one of the largest landlocked countries on earth. In July 1999, the naval base became part of the Maritime units of the Border Guard Service of the National Security Committee of Kazakhstan. It became a separate military branch by presidential decree on 7 May 2003. In February 2010, Kazakh President Nursultan Nazarbayev, in his position as supreme commander in chief of the entire military, presented the Battle Flag to the Kazakh Navy. The 612th Airbase in Aktau was opened a year later, in 2011.

Structure

The following units form the structure of the Kazakh Navy:

 Naval Headquarters
 Special Forces Unit
 Coastal Artillery
 Caspian Flotilla
 Border Service of the KNB
 1st Naval Division (Bautino)
 2nd Naval Division (Bautino)
 3rd Naval Division (Atyrau)

Aktau Naval Academy 
The Aktau Naval Academy of the Ministry of Defense of Kazakhstan was the main educational institution of the naval forces. It established in March 2001 by order of the national government on the basis of the Vocational Technical School No. 2. which preceded it. It was reorganized into a naval institute on July 10, 2003, effectively upgrading its status as a nationally recognized military school. Graduates of the institute have served in ships and coastal units of the Navy and maritime units of the Border Service of the National Security Committee of the Republic of Kazakhstan. In 2011, the institute was deactivated and liquidated.

Commanders
 Rear Admiral  (6 November 2008 – 17 July 2009)
 Vice Admiral  (30 September 2009 – 18 April 2018)
 Rear Admiral  (18 April 2018 – present)

Naval Equipment

Ranks and insignia

Commissioned officer ranks
The rank insignia of commissioned officers.

Other ranks
The rank insignia of non-commissioned officers and enlisted personnel.

References 

Kazakh Naval Forces
Military units and formations established in 1993
Military units and formations established in 2003
Navies by country
Naval forces in the Caspian Sea